This is a list of castles and chateaux located in the Pardubice Region of the Czech Republic.

B
 Běstvina Chateau
 Biskupice Chateau
 Boršov Castle
 Brandýs nad Orlicí Castle
 Březovice Chateau

C
 Čachnov Chateau
 Choceň Chateau
 Choltice Chateau
 Chrast Chateau
 Chroustovice Chateau
 Chrudim Castle
 Cimburk Castle

D
 Dlouhá Loučka Castle
 Domoradice Chateau
 Dřel Castle

H
 Heřmanův Městec Chateau
 Hoješín Chateau
 Hrad u Nekoře Castle
 Hradiště nad Semtěší Castle
 Hrochův Týnec Chateau

J
 Jaroměřice Chateau
 Jevíčko Chateau

K
 Karle Castle
 Kladruby nad Labem Chateau
 Koclířov Chateau
 Kočičí hrádek Castle
 Koldín Chateau
 Kostelec u Heřmanova Městce Castle
 Košumberk Castle
 Kunětická Hora Castle
 Kyšperk Castle

L
 Lanškroun Chateau
 Lanšperk Castle
 Letohrad Chateau
 Lichnice Castle
 Litice Castle
 Litomyšl Chateau

M
 Medlešice Chateau
 Mendryka Chateau
 Moravany Chateau
 Moravská Třebová Chateau

N
 Nabočany Chateau
 Nasavrky Chateau
 Neulust Chateau
 Nové Hrady Castle
 Nové Hrady Chateau

O
 Oheb Castle
 Orlice Chateau
 Orlík Castle

P
 Pardubice Chateau
 Plankenberk Castle
 Polička Castle
 Přestavlky Chateau

R
 Rabštejnek Castle
 Radkov Castle
 Ronov nad Doubravou Chateau
 Rosice Chateau
 Rozpakov Castle
 Rudoltice Chateau
 Rychmburk Castle

S
 Seč Chateau
 Semín Chateau
 Slatiňany Chateau
 Strádov Castle
 Svobodné Hamry Chateau
 Svojanov Castle

T
 Tatenice Chateau
 Třebovské hradisko Castle
 Třemošnice Chateau

V
 Vildštejn Castle
 Vraní Hora Castle

Z
 Zdechovice Chateau
 Žamberk Chateau
 Žampach Castle
 Žumberk Castle
 Zámrsk Chateau
 Zítkov Castle

See also
 List of castles in the Czech Republic
 List of castles in Europe
 List of castles

External links 
 Castles, Chateaux, and Ruins 
 Czech Republic - Manors, Castles, Historical Towns
 Hrady.cz 

Castles in the Pardubice Region
Pardubice